Rommel Museum may refer to one of the following museums devoted to Erwin Rommel:
 Rommel Museum, Blaustein, a museum in Blaustein, Germany 
 Rommel Museum, Mersa Matruh, a museum in Mersa Matruh, Egypt